NikitA is a Ukrainian pop duo formed in Ukraine by Yuriy Nikitin. 

NikitA is one of the most controversial bands in the Russian speaking world. They are said to be one of the most unusual Ukrainian music bands, as their specified theme of music is "Sexual Aggression".

Overview
The band sings in duet. Nikitin's idea to create the band was under development for quite some time. One of the initial versions of the band's name were Sireny and Divas, however when Nikitin found Dasha and Yulia they decided to name it NikitA which was the name the two ladies used to refer to Nikitin. Nikitin selected Dasha at the Russian-based music project Fabrika Zvezd created by Alla Pugacheva.

Yulia was found by Nikitin a little bit later. Kavtaradze prior to NikitA performed for another band "А.R.М.I.A" (as Army). She left that band being pregnant and after giving birth Yulia tried for Nikitin's music project.

The video director of "Mashyna" was Alexander Filatovich. Choreography for the band was composed by Anastasia Snadna who had prior experience in that field in the "А.Р.М.И.Я" (Kavtaradze's former band). The music director of the band is Roman Babenko who writes lyrics and composes music.

In 2011 the band went through some changes in its cast when Yulia Kavtaradze was replaced with her former colleague from A.R.M.I.A., Anastasia Kumeiko. After that, in 2012, the group added another member Yulia Brychkovska. Group renamed for "Dasha Astafieva & NIKITA" in 2016.

The trio appeared on the covers of major international men’s magazines in Russia, Ukraine, Germany, Slovenia, South Africa, Poland and other countries.

The group is contracted by the mamamusic music casting company that beside NikitA works with already mentioned "А.Р.М.И.Я" as well as "neAngely" ("НЕАНГЕЛЫ"), Iryna Bilyk, and others.

Other performances of participants 

Dasha is also known for being one of the Playboy's playmates in January 2009 (US version). Dasha is a Central Ukraine native, born in the city of Ordzhonikidze. While pursuing a career as a model, Dasha also studied at Dnipropetrovsk Theatrical College.

Current members 

TBA (2017–present) — casting

Former members

Dasha Astafieva (2008–2017) — vocal
 Anastasiya Kumeiko (2011–2016) — vocal

Yulia Kavtaradze (2008–2011) — vocal
Yulia Brychkovskaya (2012–2016)  — vocal
Antonina Chumak (2016–2017) — dancer
Alice Trembitskaya (2016–2017) — dancer

Discography

Albums
2009 – Mashina (Car)
2014 – Hozyain (Owner/ Master)

Singles
 2008 - "Mashina" (Car)
 2009 - "Zaychik" (Bunny)
 2009 - "Veryovki" (Ropes)
 2009 - "Soldat" (Soldier)
 2010 - "Koroleva" (Queen)
 2011 - "Iskusayu" / English version "Bite"
 2011 - "20:12" / English version "My Love"
 2012 - "Avocado" / in English version too
 2013 - "Sineye Plat'e" (Blue Dress)
 2013 - "Igra" (Game)
 2013 - "Ya Znayu Eto Ty" (I know it's you)
 2014 - "Himiya" (Chemistry)
 2014 - "Hozyain" (Master)
 2014 - "Gonschik" (Racer)
2015 - "Vodopadon" (Falls)
2015 - "Vdykhay" / English version "Breathe in" (2016)
2016 - "Ropes"
2017 - "Nesmelaya" (Timid)

Videography

References

External links
 Nikita profile
 Official website
  Picture of Kavtaradze who among numerous other local celebrities was attending a local party hosted by a former Ministry of Transportation Rudkovsky

Ukrainian girl groups
Russian-language singers
Musical groups established in 2008